The Lee County School District is a public school district based in Lee County, Mississippi (USA).

The district serves the towns of: Guntown, Plantersville, Shannon, and Verona, as well as almost all of Saltillo, the community of Mooreville, and the Lee County portion of Sherman. It also includes small portions of Tupelo.

The headquarters of the district is in Tupelo.

Schools

High schools
Mooreville High School
Saltillo High School
Shannon High School

Middle schools
Guntown Middle School
Mooreville Middle School
Shannon Middle School
Plantersville Middle School

Elementary schools
Mooreville Elementary School
Saltillo Elementary School
Shannon Elementary School
Verona Elementary School
Saltillo Primary School
Shannon Primary School

Demographics

2006-07 school year
There were a total of 6,702 students enrolled in the Lee County School District during the 2006–2007 school year. The gender makeup of the district was 49% female and 51% male. The racial makeup of the district was 28.53% African American, 69.93% White, 1.09% Hispanic, 0.43% Asian, and 0.01% Native American. 44.4% of the district's students were eligible to receive free lunch.

Previous school years

Accountability statistics

See also
List of school districts in Mississippi

References

External links

Education in Lee County, Mississippi
School districts in Mississippi